Konar Dun may refer to:
 Konar Dun-e Olya